Randaberg is a municipality in Rogaland county, Norway. It is located in the traditional district of Jæren, at the northern end of the Stavanger Peninsula. The administrative centre of the municipality is the village of Randaberg.

Randaberg is located just north of the city of Stavanger. It is the northernmost conurbation of the Stavanger/Sandnes area, one of the largest urban areas in the country. The Byfjord Tunnel connects the islands of Stavanger Municipality to the east with the mainland of Randaberg. The Rogfast tunnel is going to be built from Randaberg, under the Boknafjorden, to the north side of the fjord as well as to the island of Kvitsøy.

The  municipality is the 350th largest by area out of the 356 municipalities in Norway. Randaberg is the 99th most populous municipality in Norway with a population of 11,454.

General information

{{Historical populations
|footnote = Source: Statistics Norway.
|shading = off
|align = left
|1951|2116
|1961|2884
|1971|4709
|1981|6170
|1991|7681
|2001|8762
|2011|10061
|2020|11221
}}
The parish of Randaberg was established on 1 July 1922 when it was separated from the large municipality of Hetland. Initially, there were 1,256 residents of the new municipality. The municipal borders have not changed since that time.

Name
The municipality (originally the parish) is named after the old Randaberg farm, since the first Randaberg Church was built there. The first element is the plural genitive case of rönd which means "edge", "brink", or "verge" and the last element is berg which means "mountain" ; however, the meaning of berg could also be "rock", or "cliff". Before the early 1900s, the area was known as Randeberg.

Coat of arms
The coat of arms was granted on 26 June 1981. The arms show fourteen silver/white coins on a blue field. The arms are partly canting since the name is derived from rond which means "edge" and the coins are placed around edge of the shield. The coins symbolize the ball-shaped stones found in large amounts on the beach in Randaberg.

Churches
The Church of Norway has one parish within the municipality of Randaberg. It is part of the Tungenes prosti (deanery) in the Diocese of Stavanger.

Economy
Randaberg is still an active agricultural community, and produces over 80% of Norway's parsley. About 3/5 of the land is arable, and about 2% of the inhabitants are engaged in agriculture. Dairy production, chickens, and pigs are important industries. Only Klepp municipality surpasses Randaberg and has more agricultural production in Rogaland county. The first potatoes every year are grown here in Randaberg and are given to the Royal Family of Norway. However, due to its close proximity to the large city of Stavanger, the area is becoming more urban. There are three main suburbs of Stavanger where most of Randaberg's residents live: Randaberg sentrum (310 houses), Viste/Goa (315 houses), and Grødem (135 houses).

Attractions
During the summer the beaches here are very popular, and among the finest in the area around Stavanger. This includes Sandestraen and Vistestraen. Hålandsvannet'', a small lake, is also a popular place for swimming.

History
Some of the first inhabitants of Norway settled here, and it is believed that the first people came here around 12,000 years ago. It is thought that Svarthola (local name: Vistehålå) was the main shelter for a group of 25 persons, from around 6000 BC. These people were mainly gatherers and hunters, but from around 4000 BC they also started farming. From around 2000 BC, their main activity was farming.

Government
All municipalities in Norway, including Randaberg, are responsible for primary education (through 10th grade), outpatient health services, senior citizen services, unemployment and other social services, zoning, economic development, and municipal roads. The municipality is governed by a municipal council of elected representatives, which in turn elect a mayor.  The municipality falls under the Sør-Rogaland District Court and the Gulating Court of Appeal.

Municipal council
The municipal council of Randaberg is made up of 27 representatives that are elected to four year terms. Currently, the party breakdown is as follows:

Climate

Notable people 

 Tom Tvedt (born 1968 in Randaberg) politician and Mayor of Randaberg for eight years
 Bent Høie (born 1971 in Randaberg) a politician and Minister of Health and Care Services since 2013
 Rune Holta (born 1973) a Polish speedway rider, he grew up in Randaberg

References

External links
Municipal fact sheet from Statistics Norway 

 
Jæren
Municipalities of Rogaland
1922 establishments in Norway